USNS Waters (T-AGS-45) is a United States Navy vessel tasked with supporting submarine navigation-system testing and providing ballistic missile flight test support services. In 2011, it was homeported in Port Canaveral, Florida.

Features
Waters is operated by Military Sealift Command to provide an operating platform and services for unique U.S. military and federal government missions. Special missions ships work for several different U.S. Navy customers, including Naval Sea Systems Command, Space and Naval Warfare Systems Command and the Oceanographer of the Navy.

Background
Waters was originally an oceanographic survey ship, built by the Avondale Shipyard and delivered to the US Navy in 1993. Under the sponsorship of the Strategic Systems Program Office, Waters was converted in 1998 by Detyens Shipyard to support submarine navigation system testing and ballistic missile flight test support services. Waters began operating in the fall of 1999, replacing USNS Vanguard (T-AG 194), a submarine navigation system test platform ship, deactivated in 1998; and USNS Range Sentinel (T-AGM 22), a flight test navigation support ship deactivated in 1997.

References

External links
 Website at MSC Ship Inventory
 Photo gallery at NavSource.org

Research vessels of the United States Navy
1992 ships